Sin Rith is a Cambodian judge and reserve member of the Khmer Rouge Tribunal. He was appointed lead prosecutor of the Supreme Court of Cambodia in 2005. He has a PhD in law from Kazakhstan National University.

References

Living people
Year of birth missing (living people)
Cambodian judges
Khmer Rouge Tribunal judges
Place of birth missing (living people)
21st-century Cambodian people